North Victoria was a provincial electoral district in British Columbia, Canada.  It was created from a partition of the old Victoria riding, one of the province's first twelve, and first appeared on the hustings in 1894 as part of a redistribution of the old Victoria riding, along with South Victoria.  For other Victoria-area ridings please see Victoria (electoral districts).

Electoral history 
Note: winners of each election are in bold.

|- bgcolor="white"
!align="right" colspan=3|Total valid votes
!align="right"|239
!align="right"|100.00%
!align="right"|
|- bgcolor="white"
!align="right" colspan=3|Total rejected ballots
!align="right"|
!align="right"|
!align="right"|
|- bgcolor="white"
!align="right" colspan=3|Turnout
!align="right"|%
!align="right"|
!align="right"|
|}

|- bgcolor="white"
!align="right" colspan=3|Total valid votes
!align="right"|273
!align="right"|100.00%
!align="right"|
|- bgcolor="white"
!align="right" colspan=3|Total rejected ballots
!align="right"|
!align="right"|
!align="right"|
|- bgcolor="white"
!align="right" colspan=3|Turnout
!align="right"|%
!align="right"|
!align="right"|
|}

The North Victoria riding-name disappeared in the 1903 election.  Its main successor-riding was Saanich.

Sources 

Elections BC Historical Returns

Former provincial electoral districts of British Columbia on Vancouver Island